Greater China is an informal geographical area that shares commercial and cultural ties with the Han Chinese people. The notion of "Greater China" refers to the area that usually encompasses Mainland China, Hong Kong, Macau, and Taiwan in East Asia, places where the majority are culturally and ethnically Han Chinese. Some analysts may also include places which have predominantly ethnic Chinese population such as Singapore. The term can be generalised to encompass "linkages among regional Chinese communities".

Usage
Multinational corporations frequently use the term to name their regional headquarters. For example, P&G uses it to name its regional headquarter in Guangzhou that also operates in Hong Kong and Taipei, Taiwan. Apple uses it for its regional headquarters in Shanghai.

The term is often used to avoid invoking sensitivities over the political status of Taiwan.

The term has also been used in reference to Chinese irredentism in nationalist contexts, such as the notion that China should reclaim its “lost territories” to create a Greater China.

History

The term has been used for a long time, but with differing scopes and connotations.

In the 1930s, George Cressey used it to refer to the entire Chinese Empire, as opposed to China proper. Usage by the United States on government maps in the 1940s as a political term included territories claimed by the Republic of China that were part of the previous Qing Empire, or geographically to refer to topographical features associated with China that may or may not have lain entirely within Chinese political borders. 

The concept began to appear again in Chinese-language sources in the late 1970s, referring to the growing commercial ties between the mainland and Hong Kong, with the possibility of extending these to Taiwan, with perhaps the first such reference being in a Taiwanese journal Changqiao in 1979. 

The English term subsequently re-emerged in the 1980s to refer to the growing economic ties between the regions as well as the possibility of political unification. It is not an institutionalized entity such as the EU, ASEAN, or AU. The concept is a generalization to group several markets seen to be closely linked economically and does not imply sovereignty. The concept does not always include Taiwan, for instance Cisco uses “Greater China and Taiwan” to refer to the market.

See also 

 Adoption of Chinese literary culture
 Bamboo network
 Chinese expansionism
 Chinese irredentism
 Chinese nationalism
 East Asian cultural sphere
 Nanyang
 History of China
 List of tributaries of China
 Nine-dash line
 Sinocentrism
 Sinophone
 Greater Britain

References

Chinese nationalism
China, Greater
Cross-Strait relations
China, Greater
Geography of China
Historical regions